Pelinothrips is a genus of thrips in the family Phlaeothripidae.

Species
 Pelinothrips brochotus
 Pelinothrips ornatus

References

Phlaeothripidae
Thrips
Thrips genera